Events from the year 1844 in art.

Events
 The Gypsotheca Canoviana at the Museo Canova in Possagno is completed.
 June – Henry Fox Talbot begins publication of The Pencil of Nature, the first book illustrated with photographs from a camera to be commercially published (in London).
 July 31 – Opening of the Wadsworth Atheneum, which is today the oldest art museum in the United States.

Works

 József Borsos – Portrait of Kristóf Hegedűs
 Gustave Courbet
 Portrait of Juliette Courbet (Musée du Petit Palais, Paris)
 The Hammock
 Honoré Daumier – Les bas bleus ("Bluestockings", series of lithographs)
 Eugène Delacroix – Last Words of the Emperor Marcus Aurelius
 Théodore de Gudin – La Salle's Expedition to Louisiana in 1684
 Joseph Patrick Haverty – Patrick O'Brien: The Limerick Piper
 Carlo Marochetti – Wellington Statue, Glasgow (equestrian bronze)
 Eleuterio Pagliano – İl pepe e il peperoncino
 Hiram Powers – The Greek Slave (marble)
 J. M. W. Turner – Rain, Steam and Speed – The Great Western Railway (National Gallery, London)
 Robert Walter Weir – Embarkation of the Pilgrims (United States Capitol rotunda, Washington, D.C.)

Births
 February 20 – Mihály Munkácsy, Hungarian painter (died 1909)
 February 26 – Annie Swynnerton, English painter (died 1933)
 April – Edmund Elisha Case, American painter (died 1919)
 April 14 – Pierre-Adrien Dalpayrat, French ceramicist (died 1910)
 May 21 – Henri Rousseau, "Le Douanier Rousseau", French modernist primitive painter (died 1910)
 May 22 – Mary Cassatt, American Impressionist painter (died 1926)
 July 25
 Thomas Eakins, American painter, photographer and sculptor (died 1916)
 Amanda Sidwall, Swedish painter (died 1892)
 July 31 – Léon Augustin Lhermitte, French genre painter (died 1925)
 August 5 – Ilya Repin, Russian painter and sculptor (died 1930)
 September 20 – William H. Illingworth, American photographer (died 1893)
 October 22 – Lady Margaret Forrest, French-born Australian patron of the arts (died 1929)
 October 25 – Viktor Oskar Tilgner, Austrian sculptor (died 1896)
 October 28 – Moses Jacob Ezekiel, American sculptor (died 1917)
 date unknown – Susan Isabel Dacre, English painter (died 1933)

Deaths
 January 8 – Ferdinand Piloty, German lithographer (born 1786)
 January 18 – Henry Perronet Briggs, English portrait and historical painter (born 1793)
 February 21 – Jacques-Edme Dumont, French sculptor (born 1761)
 March 6 – Francis Nicholson, English landscape painter (born 1753)
 March 24 – Bertel Thorvaldsen, Danish sculptor (born 1770)
 May 2 – William Beckford, English novelist, patron art critic (born 1760)
 May 5 – Andrew Geddes, British painter (born 1783)
 May 14 – Robert Hills, English painter and etcher (born 1769)
 July 23 – Christian Gobrecht, American engraver (born 1785)
 August 6 – Samuel Drummond, British painter especially portraits and marine genre works (born 1766)
 August 28 – Giuseppe Bernardino Bison, Italian painter, especially of history pieces, genre depictions, and whimsical and imaginary landscapes (born 1762)
 October 14 
Adélaïde Victoire Hall, French painter (born 1772)
Jan Baptiste de Jonghe, Belgian landscape painter (born 1785)
 November 2 – Sir Augustus Wall Callcott, English landscape painter (born 1779)
 November 18 – Antonín Machek, Czech painter (born 1775)
 date unknown
 Arnoldus Bloemers, Dutch painter of flowers, fruit, and animals (born 1792)
 Giovacchino Cantini, Italian engraver (born c.1780)
 Frédéric Théodore Faber, Belgian landscape and genre painter (born 1782)
 Qian Du, Chinese landscape painter during the Qing dynasty (born 1764)
 Alexander Johann Dallinger von Dalling, Austrian painter (born 1783)

References

 
Years of the 19th century in art
1840s in art